Pazardzhik Point (‘Nos Pazardzhik’ \'nos 'pa-zar-dzhik\) is a point on the southeast coast of Snow Island in the South Shetland Islands, Antarctica situated 2.1 km east-northeast of Cape Conway and 9.9 km southwest of Hall Peninsula.  Snow-free in summer.

The point is named after the city of Pazardzhik in southern Bulgaria.

Location
Bulgarian mapping in 2009.

Map
 L.L. Ivanov. Antarctica: Livingston Island and Greenwich, Robert, Snow and Smith Islands. Scale 1:120000 topographic map.  Troyan: Manfred Wörner Foundation, 2009.

References
 Pazardzhik Point. SCAR Composite Gazetteer of Antarctica.
 Bulgarian Antarctic Gazetteer. Antarctic Place-names Commission. (details in Bulgarian, basic data in English)

External links
 Pazardzhik Point. Copernix satellite image

Headlands of the South Shetland Islands
Bulgaria and the Antarctic
Pazardzhik